The 2017 IGLFA Unity Cuty was a special international tournament for the IGLFA.  It was held in Miami Beach from May 29th through June 2nd as part of the 2017 World OutGames.  This was the first official IGLFA tournament to be played as part of the World OutGames after the OutGames spun off from the Gay Games, in which the IGLFA usually has its officially recognized world championship events.

The tournament was won by the Seleccion Argentina Futbolistas Gay, their third IGLFA title after a shared Div. 2 win at the 19th IGLFA championship (played as part of the 2010 Gay Games) in Cologne and an outright Div. 1 win at the 20th IGLFA championship in Mexico City. It was the highest-attended international IGLFA tournament by number of clubs (17, from 8 countries) since the 19th IGLFA championship, though had less total teams (16) than the 21st IGLFA championship played as part of the 2014 Gay Games in Ohio.

Organization
As the tournament was already being run mainly by the IGLFA, soccer was just one of three sports to have survived when the OutGames officials announced the morning that the OutGames were to begin that most sporting events and all non-sporting events of the OutGames were to be cancelled, due to a combination of poor turnout for other sports and poor organizational skills by the OutGames officials.

Tournament structure
The Unity Cup ended up unique among IGLFA tournaments in that the "divisions" normally used by IGLFA were determined by the results of the first round of play, as opposed to teams playing in separate divisions based on registration.

The teams were divided into two groups of three and two groups of five.  The teams in groups A and B (three teams each) played all opponents in both groups A and B, for five total group stage games.  The teams in groups C and D (five teams each) played all opponent in the opposite group, also for five total group stage games.

The four first-place teams at the end of the group stage qualified for the Div. 1 semifinals, while the four second-place teams qualified for the Div. 2 semifinals.  Both sets of semifinals were A vs C and B vs D. 

This was not the original structure of the tournament, based on the list shown at the Miami OutGames Soccer page which does show registered divisions; the change is likely a function of the collapse of the OutGames.  The groups and playoffs structure still reflect this original structure, as the original Division 1 had just six teams, with the Division 1 playoffs being listed on official posters on the A/B half (three teams per group).

Participating clubs
Three teams had originally registered for the tournament but ultimately did not participate: two registered Men's/Mixed Div.2 teams (Burkina Initiative and the San Diego Sparks) and one registered women's team (Malideni). One participating team - Pan Copenhagen - does not appear to have originally registered. All four teams that qualified for the Div.1 playoffs had originally registered as Div.1 teams; a fifth qualified for and won the Div.2 playoffs.

Results

Group stage

Note: Scores for the fifth and final matches in group play are generally unavailable. Unless explicitly referenced, the results of the final matches are inferred from knowing which teams made the playoffs.

Group A

Group B

Group C

Group D

Playoffs

Division 1
SFs: SAFG over London/Toronto (3-1), Seattle over Dogos (--)

Bronze: Dogos over London/Toronto (--)

Gold: SAFG over Seattle (1-0)

Division 2
SFs: Stockholm/Copenhagen over Zorros (--), Titans 2 over Spikes (1-0)

Bronze: Spikes TBC Zorros (--)

Gold: Stockholm/Copenhagen over Titans 2 (1-0)

References

2017 in association football
2017 in sports in Florida
2017 in LGBT history
International LGBT sports organizations
LGBT events in Florida
Sports in Florida